MV Napa (1999 – present, previously MV Snohomish) is a passenger-only fast ferry operated by Golden Gate Ferry in the northern Bay Area in California, United States.

The vessel is named after Napa County, one of the member counties of the Golden Gate Bridge, Highway and Transportation District. Napa was purchased from Washington State Ferries (along with ) and will enter service with Golden Gate Transit after a refit. The Napa entered service as a substitute for  when that vessel began undergoing an engine replacement in June 2009. After Chinook returned from its refit, Napa went in for a full refitting.

Previously, as Snohomish, she was mothballed for years at the WSF Shipyard at Eagle Harbor, Bainbridge Island. Washington State Ferries announced that she was returned to service in November 2007 to replace  on the Keystone-Port Townsend run.

References

Washington State Ferries vessels
Ferries of California
High-speed craft
1999 ships